Cian William Thomas Harries (born 1 April 1997) is a professional footballer who plays as a defender for League Two club Swindon Town. He is a Wales Under-21 international.

Club career
On 25 May 2015, Harries signed his first professional contract with Coventry City on a three-year deal to begin on 1 July 2015.

During the 2016 January transfer window, Harries joined Cheltenham Town on an initial one-month loan deal. He made his début a day later coming on in the 81st minute to replace Billy Waters in the 0–0 draw against Boreham Wood. On 16 January 2016, Harries made his first start on 16 January 2016, in the FA Trophy 2–2 draw against Oxford City.

He made his debut for Coventry City, starting against Oldham Athletic on the final day. He played the full game in a 0–2 win.

He made his full home debut against Portsmouth at the Ricoh Arena in the newly named 'EFL Cup'. Coventry ran out 3–2 winners in extra-time.

After making 4 more appearances for the Sky Blues, Harries signed a new 4-year deal keeping him at the football club up till June 2020.

On 4 January 2017, Harries played a trial match for Liverpool U23s against Bangor City in a friendly. He was an unused substitute as Coventry won the 2017 EFL Trophy Final.

He made his debut for Swansea City on 28 August 2018 in the EFL Cup against Crystal Palace FC.

On 27 August 2019, Harries signed with Fortuna Sittard on a season long loan with the option of a permanent move.

Bristol Rovers
On 31 January 2020, Harries signed with Bristol Rovers for a two and a half year deal for an undisclosed fee after being recalled from loan.

On the opening day of the 2021–22 League Two season, Harries scored his first goal for the club with an impressive volley from outside of the box to level the scores in an eventual last-minute 2–1 defeat to Mansfield Town. On 19 October 2021, Harries received a career-first red card in a 1–1 draw at Colchester United, receiving a second yellow card  when the referee deemed him to be taking too long over a throw-in when Rovers were 1–0 up, just one minute before Colchester equalised. Having failed to make an appearance since 8 February, Harries was released at the end of the season following Rovers' immediate promotion back to League One.

Swindon Town
On 28 June 2022, Harries agreed to join League Two club Swindon Town on a one-year deal.

International career
In May 2017, Harries was named in the Wales under-20 squad for the 2017 Toulon Tournament. After remaining on the bench for the tournament opener, Harries was named in the starting line-up in Wales' remaining two group matches against France and Bahrain as Wales were eliminated in the group stage.

In October 2017, Harries made his Wales U21 debut in a 3–1 victory against Liechtenstein.

Career statistics

Honours
Bristol Rovers
League Two promotion: 2021–22

References

External links
Cian Harries player profile at ccfc.co.uk

1997 births
Living people
Footballers from Birmingham, West Midlands
Welsh footballers
Wales youth international footballers
English footballers
English people of Welsh descent
Association football defenders
Coventry City F.C. players
Cheltenham Town F.C. players
Swansea City A.F.C. players
Fortuna Sittard players
Bristol Rovers F.C. players
Swindon Town F.C. players
English Football League players
Eredivisie players
Wales under-21 international footballers
Welsh expatriate footballers
Expatriate footballers in the Netherlands
Welsh expatriate sportspeople in the Netherlands